The Popular Liberation Forces were a group of soldiers that separated from the Eritrean Liberation Front (ELF). Two groups left the ELF at the same time, although from different regions of Eritrea.

Based in the coastal regions of Eritrea, under the command of Ali Said Abdella, was the Shaebia or the Red Sea faction. This organization was largely made up of Muslim lowlanders.

Based in the highland regions of Eritrea, under the command of Isaias Afewerki, was the Ala faction. The name of this group came about from the place in which they held their first meeting. This organization was largely made up of Christian highlanders.

Each was attacked by the ELF to ensure that the face of Eritrean resistance was monolithic. During the Eritrean Civil War, animosity between the competing organizations grew. In 1976 these two organizations would come together with a third (Obel), and create the Eritrean People's Liberation Front.

See also
History of Eritrea
Eritrean War of Independence
Factions of the Ethiopian Civil War
Rebel groups in Eritrea
Rebel groups in Ethiopia